Walter Thomas "Wally" Somers was a New Zealand rugby league player who represented New Zealand.

Early life
Walter Thomas Somers was born on June 14, 1899. He was the son of Amy Maria (Lawrence) and Daniel Somers. He had two sisters, Eileen Elizabeth Findlay (1896-1979) and Zelda Nina Goffin (1898-1966), and one brother Daniel Robert Lawrence Somers (1894-1944).

Playing career
Somers played for Newton Rangers in the Auckland Rugby League competition and appeared in a remarkable, for the era, 138 games for them from 1917 to 1929. Early in the 1929 season he and Craddock Dufty were frustrated with the selection of the Newton team and Somers decided to retire. The following season both he and Dufty joined the Ellerslie United club where Somers played 11 matches scoring 3 tries and kicking a conversion and a penalty before retiring for the final time.

Somers represented Auckland and was first selected to play for New Zealand in 1919 on their tour of Australia where he played 6 matches. He then made his test debut against the touring Australian side on September 13 of the same year in a 32–2 loss at the Auckland Domain before a crowd of 15,000. In 1920 he was part of the Auckland team that defeated Great Britain. They were the first New Zealand team to defeat Great Britain on New Zealand soil. He also played 3 tests against England on the same tour. He was again selected for the New Zealand side to tour Australia in 1921 where he played 6 tour matches and scored 10 tries.

In 1922 the New South Wales side toured and in the final match of the tour an "Australasian" team was selected featuring 7 New Zealand players and 6 Australian players to represent the Australasian side. Somers was among those chosen and he kicked 2 goals though was sent off along with O'Connor from the New South Wales team. Somers side were soundly beaten 65-27 before a crowd of 12,000 at the Auckland Domain.

It would be 7 years before he again pulled on the New Zealand jersey when he played 2 tests against the touring England side including a 17–13 win in the first test at Carlaw Park before a massive crowd of 28,000.

Personal life
On February 18, 1925, he married Annie Josephine Ogden. They had three sons, Wallace Edward Somers (1925-2001), Richard Arthur Somers (1926-1970), and Robert Graham Somers (1927-1998).

Wally died on September 11, 1980, aged 81. He had resided in Grey Lynn in the 1960s.

References

New Zealand rugby league players
New Zealand national rugby league team players
Auckland rugby league team players
Rugby league hookers
Newton Rangers players
Ellerslie Eagles players
North Island rugby league team players
Place of birth missing
1899 births
1980 deaths